Peltigera rufescens, commonly known as the field dog lichen, is a species of terricolous (ground-dwelling), foliose lichen in the family Peltigeraceae. The common and widespread species has a cosmopolitan distribution.

Taxonomy
The lichen was first formally described as a variety of Lichen caninus 1770 by Friedrich Wilhelm Weiss. At that time, all lichens were classified in the eponymous genus Lichen, based on Carl Linnaeus' influence. Alexander von Humboldt transferred it to the genus Peltigera and promoted it to the status of species in 1793. A vernacular name for the species is field dog lichen.

The complete mitochondrial genome sequence of Peltigera rufescens was published in 2021. It has 65,199 base pairs and a cytosine+guanine content of 26.7%. Molecular phylogenetic analysis suggests a close relationship with Peltigera membranacea.

Description
Peltigera rufescens has a grey to brown coloured thallus that is often covered with a heavy tomentum (closely matted or fine hairs). The undersurface of the thallus is strongly veined, dark in colour with a paler margin. Rhizines on the underside affix the lichen to its substrate; near the centre they are so dense so as to form an almost continuous mat. Fruit bodies, or apothecia, are common in this species. They are saddle shaped and dark red brown in colour. The ascospores usually have between 3 and 5 septa and measure 40–70 by 3–5 μm. Conidiomata are sometimes produced by the lichen; the conidia are 7–10 by 2.5–4.5 μm. The photobiont partner of Peltigera rufescens is cyanobacteria from the genus Nostoc.

No lichen products are associated with Peltigera rufescens, and consequently, the expected results of standard lichen spot tests are all negative.

If grown in a metal-polluted environment, Peltigera rufescens will have a reduction in thallus size and in rhizine length, as well as denser growth of the rhizines, veins that are more profusely branched, and an increase in volume of the medulla. When treated with mercury, cadmium, or nickel, P. rufescens chlorophyll α and carotenoid concentrations will also decrease. As with other lichens, P. rufescens is a bioaccumulator of heavy metals. This may be due to the thallus having a large surface area in contact with the substrate. P. rufescens also has free amino acid concentrations higher than other lichens in similar polluted habitats, comparable to vascular plants, suggesting that this may play a role in heavy metal tolerance.

Habitat and distribution
Peltigera rufescens is a common and widespread lichen with a cosmopolitan distribution. It is most often encountered in dry, sunny habitats. It prefers more or less basic soils. Individuals that grow in association with mosses tend to grow more robustly and have a higher amount of chlorophyll α then those that do not. Not only does the moss provides a buffer against extremes in temperature variation, the  moss-associated thalli have higher photosynthetic rates, and increased protection against desiccation. Additionally, their thalli are thicker, leading to enhanced water retention. Mosses that have been recorded associating with Peltigera rufescens include Racomitrium heterostichum, Campylopus introflexus, Hypnum cupressiforme, and Polytrichum juniperinum. A study of the high-elevation biological soil crust associated with the volcanic tephra in Hawaii's Haleakalā Crater found that Peltigera rufescens was one of the two important components of this crust (the other was the moss Grimmia torquata) and occurred in about a quarter of soil specimens sampled.

Ecology
Preussia peltigerae, Dinemasporium strigosum, Lichenopenicillus versicolor, Nectriopsis lecanodes, Norrlinia peltigericola, and Scutula didymospora are lichenicolous fungi that use Peltigera rufescens as a host. In the case of Scutula didymospora, the relationship appears to be commensalistic, as the fungus, which develops on the underside of the thallus, does not cause any damage, discolouration or galls.

Bioactivity
Laboratory experiments suggest that extracts of Peltigera rufescens have insecticidal activity against the maize weevil (Sitophilus zeamais).

References

rufescens
Lichen species
Lichens described in 1793
Lichens of Europe
Lichens of North America
Cosmopolitan species